Moline Township is located in Rock Island County, Illinois, USA. At the 2010 census, its population was 23,529 and it contained 10,314 housing units.

Geography

Demographics

References

External links
City-data.com
Illinois State Archives

Townships in Rock Island County, Illinois
Townships in Illinois